The Southwest Michigan Underwater Preserve is a preservation area in the U.S. state of Michigan.  Located in Lake Michigan, it protects a five-mile-wide strip of water offshore from Michigan's Allegan, Berrien, and Van Buren Counties.  These waters include the waters offshore the port towns of Benton Harbor, Holland, St. Joseph, and South Haven, all in Michigan.  Many wrecks litter these waters.

References

External links
 Southwest Michigan Underwater Preserve Michigan Underwater Preserve Council
 SWMUP group applies for DNR approval Holland Sentinel 1996

Protected areas of Allegan County, Michigan
Protected areas of Berrien County, Michigan
Marine parks of Michigan
Protected areas of Van Buren County, Michigan